15 Minutes is the fifth studio album by English singer-songwriter Nik Kershaw, released on 6 April 1999.

Background
In a 2008 interview, Kershaw spoke of two tracks from the album after being asked for his proudest song.

Critical reception

Stephen Thomas Erlewine of AllMusic described the album as an "immaculately produced collection of modern mature pop", but felt the album concentrated too much on "sonic texture" rather than the songwriting. He concluded: "It's easy to admire the craft behind the production and the subtle songwriting, even if the songs don't work their way into your subconscious." Tom Roland of The Tennessean wrote: "Kershaw delivers 15 Minutes with a Brit boy-next-door disposition and a bed of guitars, in a swirl of restrained, midtempo pop." Dana Tofig of the Hartford Courant commented: "Kershaw has put out a new album that testifies he should have received much more time in the spotlight. 15 Minutes, although inconsistent, is filled with catchy pop songs that stand out with brilliant hooks and a touch of oddness."

Track listing
All tracks composed by Nik Kershaw

Personnel
Nik Kershaw - vocals
Dave Bronze, Paul Geary - bass
Steve Washington - drums, percussion
Arden Hart - Hammond organ on "Billy" and "What Do You Think of It So Far?"
Tony Hinnigan - whistle on "Stick Around"
Jethro East - programming on "Find Me an Angel" and "Made in Heaven"
Technical
Stephen Lipson - additional production and mixing on "Have a Nice Life" and "Stick Around"
John Carver, Paul Spencer - art direction

Singles
 "Somebody Loves You" No. 70
 B-side (standard edition) – "Wouldn't It Be Good" (acoustic), "The Riddle" (acoustic)
 B-side (limited edition) – "The Wrong Man", "Woman"
 "What Do You Think of It So Far"
 B-side – "Oxygen" (acoustic), "Woman"

References 

1998 albums
Nik Kershaw albums
albums produced by Stephen Lipson
Rhino Entertainment albums
Eagle Records albums
Britpop albums
Albums recorded at The Church Studios